Obed 'Foreman Power' Mlotsa is a Swazi professional football manager.

Career
In 2011, he coached the Swaziland national football team.

References

External links

Profile at Soccerpunter.com

Year of birth missing (living people)
Living people
Swazi football managers
Eswatini national football team managers
Place of birth missing (living people)